Moita is a municipality in the district of Setubal, Portugal. It may also refer to the following places:

 Moïta, a commune in the Haute-Corse department, France
in Portugal:
 Moita (Anadia), a civil parish in the municipality of Anadia
 Moita (parish), a civil parish in the municipality of Moita
 Moita (Sabugal), a civil parish in the municipality of Sabugal
 Moita (Marinha Grande), a civil parish in the municipality of Marinha Grande
 Moita do Norte, a civil parish in the municipality of Vila Nova da Barquinha